Count Rihard Ursini von Blagay (17 August 1786 – 14 March 1858) was an aristocrat, Slovene botanist and patron of the arts.

Early life 
Rihard was born into and old aristocratic family, which was part of the Austrian nobility, as the second son of Count Joseph Franz Ursini von Blagay (1759-1831) and his first wife, Countess Maria von Auersperg (1764-1787).

Biography 
He organized numerous cultural gatherings of Slovene en-lighteners at his estate, Polhov Gradec Castle, which he acquired through the marriage to the noble Billichgrätz family. At the site of the old castle an octagonal gloriette was later built, which his wife, Countess Antonia turned into a chapel in 1853, adding 14 shrines for the Stations of the Cross to it to create a Calvary. As one of the first Župans of the Ljubljana district, Richard operated in Slovenia. He also collected Slovene plant species for the naturalist Heinrich Freyer.

Personal life 
In 1808 he married his third cousin, Baroness Antonia von Billichgrätz zu Baumkircherthurm und Hilzenegkh (1792-1861), an heiress of Polhov Gradec. She was the younger daughter of Baron Joseph Anton von Billichgrätz zu Baumkircherthurm und Hilzenegkh (1748-1808) and his wife, Countess Maria Josefa von Gallenberg (1760-1813). They did not have children.

See also 
 List of Slovenian botanists
 Polhov Gradec

References

Slovenian botanists
1858 deaths
1786 births